Geobacter lovleyi is a gram-negative metal-reducing and tetrachloroethene-dechlorinating proteobacterium. It has potential as a bioremediation organism, and is actively researched as such.

See also 
 List of bacterial orders
 List of bacteria genera

References

Further reading
Amos, Benjamin K., et al. "Detection and quantification of Geobacter lovleyi strain SZ: implications for bioremediation at tetrachloroethene-and uranium-impacted sites." Applied and Environmental Microbiology 73.21 (2007): 6898–6904.

External links

LPSN
Type strain of Geobacter lovleyi at BacDive -  the Bacterial Diversity Metadatabase

Bacteria described in 2009
Thermodesulfobacteriota